The trihydroxybenzenes (or benzenetriols) are organic compounds with the formula C6H3(OH)3.  Also classified as polyphenols, they feature three hydroxyl groups substituted onto a benzene ring.  They are white solids with modest solubility in water.

{| class="wikitable"
|-
! Pyrogallol
! Hydroxyquinol 
! Phloroglucinol
|-
| Benzene-1,2,3-triol
| Benzene-1,2,4-triol
| Benzene-1,3,5-triol
|-
| 
| 
| 
|}

The enzyme pyrogallol hydroxytransferase uses benzene-1,2,3,5-tetrol and benzene-1,2,3-triol (pyrogallol), whereas its two products are benzene-1,3,5-triol (phloroglucinol) and benzene-1,2,3,5-tetrol. This enzyme can be found in Pelobacter acidigallici.

See also
 Dihydroxybenzenes
 Tetrahydroxybenzenes
 Pentahydroxybenzene
 Hexahydroxybenzene

References